Rockford High School is a small school serving the communities of Rockford, Greenfield, and Corcoran, Minnesota, United States. The student body has 498 children from grades 912. The school is locally known for its music and arts programs. The principal is Rhonda Dean.

Other schools in the Rockford Area Schools ISD883
Rockford Elementary Arts Magnet School
Rockford Middle School

References

Public high schools in Minnesota
Schools in Wright County, Minnesota